Addlethorpe is a small village situated just off the A52 west of Ingoldmells in the East Lindsey district of Lincolnshire, England.

Addlethorpe is recorded in the 1086 Domesday Book with 102 households and two churches.

The parish church is dedicated to Saint Nicholas and is a Grade I listed building dating from the 15th century, being restored in 1875. Both the tower and the font are 15th-century, and the pulpit is early 18th-century. It lost its chancel in 1706. In the churchyard is the lower half of a 14th-century churchyard cross, which is both Grade II listed, and a scheduled monument.

The Wesleyan Methodists built a chapel here in 1837, which was rebuilt in 1968. It is now part of the Skegness Coast Methodist Churches group, with services every Sunday.

Addlethorpe Windmill was built about 1830 to replace an earlier post mill, and was constructed of tarred red brick. It ceased working in 1944, and today is missing its cap. It is a Grade II listed building.

Village includes two caravan sites.

References

External links

Location map of Addlethorpe
Aerial view of Addlethorpe
Addlethorpe Parish Council
 
Skegness Coast Methodist Churches
Addlethorpe Golf Course

Villages in Lincolnshire
Civil parishes in Lincolnshire
East Lindsey District